Lindsay Davenport was the defending champion but lost in the semifinals to Steffi Graf.

Graf won in the final 6–4, 6–1 against Jana Novotná.

Seeds
A champion seed is indicated in bold text while text in italics indicates the round in which that seed was eliminated. The top four seeds received a bye to the second round.

  Lindsay Davenport (semifinals)
  Jana Novotná (final)
  Arantxa Sánchez-Vicario (second round)
  Steffi Graf (champion)
  Nathalie Tauziat (first round)
  Patty Schnyder (second round)
  Amanda Coetzer (quarterfinals)
  Dominique Van Roost (first round)

Draw

Final

Section 1

Section 2

External links
 1998 Pilot Pen International Draw

Connecticut Open (tennis)
Pilot Pen International – Women's Singles
Women's Singles